Sibaté is a municipality and town of Colombia in the Soacha Province, part of the department of Cundinamarca. It forms part of the metropolitan area of the capital. Sibaté borders Soacha in the north, Pasca and Fusagasugá in the south, Soacha in the east and Silvania and Granada in the west.

Etymology 
Sibaté means in Chibcha "Leak of the lake", according to scholar Miguel Triana.

History 
In the times before the Spanish conquest, the area of Sibaté was inhabited by the Muisca. The Bogotá savanna was ruled by the zipa based in Bacatá.

Modern Sibaté was founded on November 24, 1967.

Economy 
Main economical activities of Sibaté are agriculture (potatoes, peas and strawberries) and livestock farming.

References 

Municipalities of Cundinamarca Department
Populated places established in 1967
Muisca Confederation
Muysccubun